The Fast Open Pairs national bridge championship is held at the summer American Contract Bridge League (ACBL) North American Bridge Championship (NABC).

The Fast Open Pairs is a four session MP pairs event, two qualifying sessions and two final sessions.
Each set of two sessions is played on one day.
The event typically starts on the second Thursday of the NABC.
The event is open.
Players are required to play each two board round in eleven minutes.
Typically, there is only a small (30–45 minutes) break between the two sessions.

History

The NABC+ Fast Open Pairs is a matchpoint event where tables are permitted 11 minutes to finish their two-board rounds, rather than the standard 15 minutes. The event consists of two qualifying sessions and two final sessions. It was first contested in 2000 in Anaheim, California.

Winners

In the first 16 renditions to 2015, the pair Doug Doub–Adam Wildavsky had one win and two seconds. Geoff Hampson and Chris Willenken both had two wins with different partners.

References

Other sources
List of previous winners, Page 18

2008 winners, Page 1

External links

 NABC Winners: Fast Open Pairs – official database view, all years

North American Bridge Championships